German submarine U-1302 was a Type VIIC/41 U-boat of Nazi Germany's Kriegsmarine for service in World War II. She was commissioned on 25 May 1944.

U-1302 served with 4th U-boat Flotilla for training and later with 11th U-boat Flotilla from 1 January 1945 until 7 March 1945.

U-1302 completed one patrol between February and March 1945, sinking three ships totalling .

Design
German Type VIIC/41 submarines were preceded by the heavier Type VIIC submarines. U-1302 had a displacement of  when at the surface and  while submerged. She had two shafts and two  propellers.

U-1302 was fitted with five  torpedo tubes (four fitted at the bow and one at the stern), fourteen torpedoes, one  SK C/35 naval gun, (220 rounds), one  Flak M42 and two  C/30 anti-aircraft guns. The boat had a complement of between forty-four and sixty.

Service history

Summary of raiding history

See also
 Battle of the Atlantic (1939-1945)

References

Bibliography

External links

German Type VIIC/41 submarines
U-boats commissioned in 1944
U-boats sunk in 1945
World War II submarines of Germany
World War II shipwrecks in the Irish Sea
1944 ships
Ships built in Flensburg
U-boats sunk by depth charges
U-boats sunk by Canadian warships
Ships lost with all hands
Maritime incidents in March 1945